Affection exchange theory (AET) was introduced in 2001 by Kory Floyd, who is currently a professor of communication at the University of Arizona. The theory was first presented in two of Floyd’s research projects. The first was in a paper presented to the Western States Communication Association in Coeur d’Alene, ID in February 2001. The paper was titled "Elements of an affection exchange theory: Socioevolutionary paradigm for understanding affectionate communication". The second was in an article titled “Human Affection Exchange I: Reproductive probability as a predictor of men’s affection with their sons,” published in The Journal of Men’s Studies in Fall 2001.  When this theory was constructed, Floyd was working as a professor at Arizona State University in Tempe, Arizona in the Hugh Downs School of Human Communication. Many studies had been done up to this point (including some of Floyd’s own research pieces) regarding affection and its involvement in interpersonal relationships, particularly between romantic partners and between parents and their children. In 2001, Floyd introduced AET, which was the first theory to address some of the short and long-term effects of the exchange of affection.

Theoretical components 
Affection is commonly thought of as being one of the most fundamental of human needs (Rotter, Chance, & Phares, 1972). Affectionate expressions therefore could be seen as salient to an individual’s well-being and relationship formation (Floyd et al., 2005, p. 286). According to Floyd (2005), “given the breadth of relational experience in which affectionate communication is common, it is little wonder that it plays such an important role in individual well-being (p. 286). The importance of affection and affection communication could explain some of the reasons that Floyd introduced the affection exchange theory. Floyd explains, “affection exchange theory treats affectionate communication as an adaptive behavior that contributes to humans’ long-term viability and procreative success” (Floyd, 2001, p. 40). He also described AET this way: “AET posits that affection exchange contributes to survival because it promotes pair bonding and the increased access to resources pair bonds provide” (Floyd, 2001, pp. 40–41). Another facet of AET was that the exchange of affection served as an indicator to another individual that he or she was a good prospect for parenthood (Floyd, 2001). Lastly, Floyd indicated that when parents show affection to their children, their children are more likely to be successful in reproducing; thus, the parents’ genes will be passed down further (Floyd, 2001). To Floyd, this was seen as a benefit of affection exchange.

Five postulates of AET 
Floyd pointed out five postulates of Affection Exchange Theory in 2006.

1)“The need and capacity for affection are inborn”(Floyd, 2006, p.161).
Affection exchange is a basic human need and ability, as an innate and stable experience across different historical and social conditions(Floyd, 2006, p.161).

2)“Affectionate feelings and affectionate expressions are distinct experiences”(Floyd, 2006, p.163).
People would modify their emotional displays depending on the specific situations(Ekman and Friesen,1975).

3)“Affectionate communication is adaptive with respect to human viability and fertility”(Floyd, 2006, p.164).
The survival chances can be increased by affectionate communication because there are connections with others, coming with achievable resources both material and emotional to help survive. Besides, it is a physically pleasant choice for human to exchange affection (Littlejohn et al., 2021, p.226).

4)“There are differences among people in their tolerance for affection”(Littlejohn et al., 2021, p.226).
People have different preferences about the behaviors of affection exchange, such as the skin contacts, so there is no a general standard of affectionate expressions.(Littlejohn et al., 2021, p.226).

5)“People are averse to affectionate behaviors that violate their standards of tolerance”(Littlejohn et al., 2021, p.226).
There would be biological and behavioral reactions from the uncomfortable affectionate behaviors(Floyd, 2006, p.179). For some overwhelmed affectionate communication, “high levels of affection could result in transgressions being perceived as more hurtful and severe resulting in higher levels of rumination”(Horan, 2012, p.121).

Motivation to develop AET

Receivers' perspective 
Many studies had shown the benefits of physical and psychological benefits of receiving affectionate communication (Floyd, 2002, p136). For example, Schwartz and Russek (1998) found that college students would experience less physical and psychological distress with the love and caring showed by their parents, while Shuntich, Loh, and Katz (1998) found “received affection to be negatively related to alcohol abuse and physical aggression toward family members”. Similarly, Floyd had done much work in the area of affection involved in communication processes before introducing this theory. One of the areas that was so unique in the study of affection was the idea of the expectations involved in affection exchange. Canary et al. (2008) point out that the expectations involved in affection exchange as well as a curiosity about the evolutionary and biological bases for affection expectations are what led Floyd to develop this theory (p. 72). Canary et al. (2008) also note, “In AET, affection is thought of as an adaptive behavior that is helpful to long-term human survival by promoting bonding and increased access to resources. If this theory is correct, affection ought to increase as its ability to enhance survival increases” (p. 72).

Affection givers' perspective 
Affectionate communication is a resource that begets benefits not only when it is received but also when it is given (Floyd, 2002, p136). In Floyd’s series paper “Human affection exchange: V. Attributes of the highly affectionate” (2002), he talked about the benefits from Individual-level predictions and Social-level predictions.

Individual-level characteristics 
According to Floyd’s (2002) findings in the study, “individuals who are high affection communicators report greater happiness, higher self-esteem, less depression, less stress, and greater overall mental health than do low affection communicators” (p.144).

High affection communicators are more comfortable with intimate relationships, more permissible with closeness, and have “less of a tendency to view relationships as being of secondary importance than do low affection communicators” (Floyd, 2002, pp.144-145).

High affection communicators are more likely to have a secure attachment style, while low affection communicators are more likely to have a fearful/avoidant attachment style (Floyd, 2002, pp.145).

High affection communicators reported greater femininity than did low affection communicators (Floyd, 2002, p.146). Men who are high affection communicators could report greater femininity than low-affection women (Floyd, 2002, p.145).

Social-level characteristics 
High affection communicators are more socially outgoing and will not isolate themselves from society (Floyd, 2002, p.146).

High affection communicators could create romantic relationships more easily and stay satisfied in those relationships (Floyd, 2002, p.146).

Implications of the theory 
A great deal of this theory’s premise can be linked back to Darwin’s principles that state that reproductivity and survival are what serve as humans’ most fundamental motivations. With these ideas in mind, it follows that humans would do everything they could to make sure that their genes carry on, even if that means (intentionally or unintentionally) showing more affection to a child that the parent knew was more likely to reproduce. Linked to this idea, Floyd’s studies have shown that fathers display less affection toward their sons if the sons identify as homosexual or bisexual (Canary et al., 2008, p. 74). In general, AET presents the idea that parents are more likely to show affection to their children who are most likely to pass on the family genes.  AET has been used a great deal in studies dealing with relationships between fathers and sons, particularly as it relates to men’s sexuality and how that impacts the amount of affection a father shows to his son, the communicative behaviors involved in AET, and how the amount of affection that a father shows to his son correlates with the amount of affection that the son displays toward his children and the generations that follow.

Applications of the theory

Stress management 
Stress management is a constant topic in modern society. In fact, McEwan (1999) estimated that “stress and stress-related disorders take an annual economic toll of nearly $200 billion in the United States alone”. According to Floyd et al. (2007), “expressing affection can be instrumental in alleviating acute stress” (p.123), the AET could be used to “aid researchers and clinicians in the development of techniques to help people to manage stress more efficiently” (Floyd & Mikkelson, 2007, p.124).

Predicting resting heart rate and free cortisol secretion 
Floyd and his coworkers (2007) gathered 30 students from a large university in the southwestern United States to do the research. After the stress induction, students were asked to identify their most affectionate relationship and use the “affectionate communication index (ACI)” (Floyd & Morman, 1998) to report their affectionate communication in the relationship. The researchers kept track of the students’ heart rate and free cortisol level before, between, and after the induction. The data showed that verbal and supportive affection in participants' most affectionate relationships could lower participants’ resting heart rate and is inversely associated with the magnitude of cortisol increase.

Accelerating neuroendocrine stress recovery 
Floyd and other researchers did a similar test as the previous one in 2007. Only in this study, they divided participants into three groups. After taking six standard laboratory stressors tests, each group was asked to write to loved ones expressing the feeling of love, think of loved ones, and sit without doing anything. The result showed that the expression group has lower cortisol values than those in the other two groups. This research supports the idea that "communicating affection following exposure to an acute stressor accelerates adrenocortical recovery" (Floyd et al., 2007, p130).

Connections to romantic relationships 
Affectionate communication is one way individuals express love and appreciation (Floyd, 2006). Expressing love is fundamental for a romantic relationship to form and persist. However, for military couples during deployment, it is hard for them to see each other and express love. Alaina Veluscek (2018) pointed out that affectionate writing during military deployment is one effective way of showing love, and “individuals who engaged in affectionate writing reported higher levels of relational satisfaction than those who did not”.

However, affectionate communication is not always positive (Horan & Booth-Butterfield, 2011). For example, deception is one of the risks of affection (Horan & Booth-Butterfield, 2011). In Horan’s study (2015), he explained that people are not comfortable talking about previous sexual behaviors with their partners and some individuals might lie about their sexual histories. Although sex is a communicative activity that could gauge affection, it causes relationship risks when there are deceptions involved. Horan’s study (2015) focused on sexually transmitted infections (STI). He believed that “one preventive method of STI is honesty surrounding sexual history conversations” (p.451).

Affection deprivation 
Affection deprivation is a concept added by Floyd to AET, which is “the condition of wanting more tactile affectionate communication than one receives”(Floyd, 2014). It could be used to explain why some affectionate communication result in unhealthy relationships (Hesse et al., 2021). Affection deprivation is a concept different from loneliness both conceptually and empirically (Floyd & Hesse, 2017). There are several indicators related to affection deprivation in close relationship, such as closeness and commitment (Hesse & Mikkelson, 2017). “Affection deprivation affects general, social, mental, physical, and/or relational well-being, instructing people in ways to increase their tactile affection can effect improvements to their health and stability”(Floyd, 2014, p.398).

Alexithymia 
“Alexithymia is a personality trait characterized by a relative inability to understand, process, and describe emotions” (Hesse & Floyd, 2008, p.796).

The symptom has a strong inversely relationship with affectionate experience, close relationship and happiness, and it is directly related to stress and depression(Hesse & Floyd, 2008, p.805).

Connection to family relationship

Grandparent - grandchild relationship  
Grandchildren receive a lot of affection and care from their grandparents and their relationship with grandparents is highly valued and influential in their life (Downs,1988). From related studies based on Affection exchange theory, grandchildren received more love and esteem from grandmothers and more humor and memories from grandfathers(Mansson, 2013). More affectionate communication from grandmother would bring more positive and healthier habits to their grandchildren (Salazar et al., 2022).

References 

Canary, D, Cody, M., & Manusov, V. (2008). Interpersonal communication: A goals-based approach. Boston, MA: Bedford/St. Martin’s.
Floyd, K. (2001, February). Elements of an affection exchange theory: Socioevolutionary paradigm for understanding affectionate communication. Paper presented to Western States Communication Association, Coeur d’Alene, ID.
Floyd, K. (2001). Human affection exchange I: Reproductive probability of men’s affection with their sons. Journal of Men’s Studies, 10, 39-50.
Floyd, K. (2002). Human affection exchange: V. attributes of the highly affectionate.	Communication Quarterly, 50(2), 135–152. 
Floyd, K. (2006). Communicating affection: Interpersonal behavior and social context. Cambridge, UK: Cambridge University Press.
Floyd, K., Hess, J. A., Mizo, L. A., Halone, K. K., Mikkelson, A. C., & Tusing, K. J. (2005). Human Affection Exchange: VIII. Further Evidence of the Benefits of Expressed Affection. Communication Quarterly, 53(3), 285-303. ProQuest. 10.1080/01463370500101071
Floyd, K., Mikkelson, A. C., Tafoya, M. A., Farinelli, L., La Valley, A. G., Judd, J., Haynes, M. T., Davis, K. L., & Wilson, J. (2007). Human Affection Exchange: XIII. Affectionate Communication Accelerates Neuroendocrine Stress Recovery. Health Communication, 22(2), 123-132. Taylor & Francis Online. 
Floyd, K., Mikkelson, A. C., Tafoya, M. A., Farinelli, L., La Valley, A. G., Judd, J., Haynes, M. T., Davis, K. L., & Wilson, J. (2007). Human Affection Exchange: XIV. Relational Affection Predicts Resting Heart Rate and Free Cortisol Secretion During Acute Stress. Behavioral Medicine, 32(4), 151-6. 
Floyd K, Morman MT (1998). The measurement of affectionate communication. Commun Q., 46:144-162.
Horan, S. M. (2016). Further understanding sexual communication: Honesty, deception, safety, and risk. Journal of Social and Personal Relationships, 33(4), 449–468. 
Horan, S. M., Booth-Butterfield, M. (2011). Is it worth lying for? Physiological and emotional implications of recalled deceptive affection. Human Communication Research, 37, 78–106. 
McEwan, B. (1999). Stress and the brain. In R. Conlan (Ed.), States of mind: New discoveries about how our brains make us who we are. (pp. 81–102). New York: Wiley.
Rotter, J. B., Chance, J. E., & Phares, E. J. (1972). Applications of a social learning theory of personality. New York: Holt, Rinehart & Winston.
Schwartz, G. E., & Russek, L. G. (1998). Family love and lifelong health? A challenge for clinical psychology. In D. K. Routh & R. J. DeRubeis (Eds.), The science of clinical psychology: Accomplishments and future directions (pp. 121-146). Washington, DC: American Psychological Association.
Shuntich, R. J., Loh, D., & Katz, D. (1998). Some relationships among affection, aggression, and alcohol abuse in the family setting. Perceptual and Motor Skills, 86,1051-1060.
Veluscek, A. M. (2018). Military Couples' Communication during Deployment: A Proposed Expansion of Affection Exchange Theory 
Hesse, C., & Floyd, K. (2008). Affectionate experience mediates the effects of alexithymia on mental health and interpersonal relationships. Journal of Social and Personal Relationships, 25(5), 793–810.
Horan, S. M. (2012). Affection Exchange Theory and Perceptions of Relational Transgressions. Western Journal of Communication, 76(2), 109–126.
Mansson, D. H. (2013). Testing the Grandchildren’s Received Affection Scale Using Affection Exchange Theory. Psychological Reports, 112(2), 553–562.
Leslie, R. S., Khandelwal, P., & Castillo, Y. (2022). The effects of received grandmothers’ affection on adult grandchildren’s health behaviors using affection exchange theory. BMC Public Health, 22, 1-13.
Floyd, K., & Hesse, C. (2017). Affection Deprivation is Conceptually and Empirically Distinct From Loneliness. Western Journal of Communication, 81(4), 446–465.
Hesse, C., Mikkelson, A., & Tian, X. (2021). Affection deprivation during the COVID-19 pandemic: A panel study. Journal of Social and Personal Relationships, 38(10), 2965–2984.
Hesse, C., & Mikkelson, A. C. (2017). Affection Deprivation in Romantic Relationships. Communication Quarterly, 65(1), 20–38. 
Littlejohn, S. W., Foss, K. A., & Oetzel, J. G. (2021). Theories of human communication (Twelfth edition.). Waveland Press, Inc.
Floyd, K. (2014). Relational and Health Correlates of Affection Deprivation. Western Journal of Communication, 78(4), 383–403.
Ekman, P. and W. V. Friesen (1975). Pictures of Facial Affect. Palo Alto, CA, Consulting Psychologists Press, Inc.
Downs VC. Grandparents and grandchildren: The relationship between self-disclosure and solidarity in an intergenerational relationship. Commun Res Rep. 1988;5(2):173–9

Theory of mind